Abdul Kahar Mim (born 6 November 1968) is an Indonesian former professional tennis player.

Kahar Mim, born and raised in Samarinda on the island of Borneo, was a Southeast Asian Games gold medalist for Indonesia in 1987. His only Davis Cup appearance was in a 1989 World Group tie against reigning champions West Germany in Karlsruhe, where he lost singles rubbers to Boris Becker and Carl-Uwe Steeb.

See also
List of Indonesia Davis Cup team representatives

References

External links
 
 
 

1968 births
Living people
Indonesian male tennis players
Southeast Asian Games medalists in tennis
Southeast Asian Games gold medalists for Indonesia
Southeast Asian Games bronze medalists for Indonesia
Competitors at the 1987 Southeast Asian Games
People from Samarinda
Sportspeople from East Kalimantan